John Lowey may refer to:

John Lowey (boxer) (born 1966), Northern Irish boxer
John Lowey (footballer) (1958–2019), English footballer